Elimeia is a former municipality in Kozani regional unit, West Macedonia, Greece. Since the 2011 local government reform it is part of the municipality Kozani, of which it is a municipal unit. The municipal unit has an area of 99.166 km2. The population is 5,910 (2011). The seat of the municipality was in Krokos. In the referendum that took place in the spring of 2006, 55% of the inhabitants voted for the union of their municipality with Kozani.

References

Former municipalities in Western Macedonia
Populated places in Kozani (regional unit)